Ítalo Eugenio Estupiñán Martínez (1 January 1952 – 1 March 2016) was an Ecuadorian footballer who played as a forward during his career.

Club career
Born in Esmeraldas, Estupiñán began playing football for Club Social y Deportivo Macará and made his Ecuadorian Serie A debut at age 17. He would also play for Club Deportivo El Nacional and Club Sport Emelec in Ecuador's top division. He played several seasons in the Primera División de México with Deportivo Toluca F.C., Club América, Atlético Campesinos and Puebla F.C., winning the league with Toluca in 1974–75 and with Puebla in 1982–83.

Clubs

Year   Club                  App (Gls)*
1970-1971 Macara(Ecu)
1972-1973 CD El Nacional(Ecu)
1975-1976 Deportivo Toluca F.C.(Mex)
1977-1979 Club America(Mex)
1980      Universidad Católica (Quito)
1980-1981 Atletico Campesinos(Mex)
1982-1983 Puebla FC(Mex)
1986      Emelec(Ecu)

International career
He obtained 14 caps for the Ecuador national football team during the 1980s, scoring 2 goals.

Ecuador
1986-1993 Ecuador          6 (2)

Club Titles
 Mexico
 Deportivo Toluca F.C.
 Primera División: 1974/75
 Puebla F.C.
 Primera División: 1982/83
 Club América
 Interamerican Cup : 1977

Personal Titles
"Citlalli Price" for the best player of the year in 1974 (Mexico)

Video
 (Spanish)
 (Spanish)

References

External links

Toluca Tercer Titulo: 1974-1975 (Spanish)
Copa Interamericana 1977 RSSSF

1952 births
2016 deaths
Sportspeople from Esmeraldas, Ecuador
Association football forwards
Ecuadorian footballers
Ecuador international footballers
Liga MX players
C.S.D. Macará footballers
C.D. El Nacional footballers
Deportivo Toluca F.C. players
Club América footballers
C.D. Universidad Católica del Ecuador footballers
Querétaro F.C. footballers
Club Puebla players
C.S. Emelec footballers
Ecuadorian expatriate footballers
Expatriate footballers in Mexico